Jörn Renzenbrink (born 17 July 1972) is a retired professional tennis player from Germany.

Career
A right hander, Renzenbrink had his best Grand Slam performance in the 1994 US Open, when he made it into the fourth round. He started his campaign with a straight sets victory over South African Grant Stafford, followed by a four-sets defeat of Morocco's Karim Alami and then a win over Italian Andrea Gaudenzi. In the fourth round he met Jonas Björkman and took him to five sets, but lost.

Renzenbrink never won a singles tournament on the ATP Tour but was runner-up on one occasion, at the 1994 KAL Cup Korea Open. He did however win a doubles title, with fellow German Markus Zoecke, as qualifiers, at the 1995 Hall of Fame Tennis Championships in Newport, Rhode Island.

He won two ATP Challenger Series tournaments during his career, the first in Andorra in 1993 and the other at Aachen in his home country.

ATP Career Finals

Singles: 1 (1 runner-up)

Doubles: 1 (1 title)

ATP Challenger and ITF Futures finals

Singles: 4 (2–2)

Doubles: 2 (0–2)

Performance timeline

Singles

References

External links
 
 

1972 births
Living people
German male tennis players
Tennis players from Hamburg